Midsayap Diagnostic Center and Hospital, Inc. (abbreviated as MDCHI, locally known as MDC Hospital) is a 58-bed capacity level-1 private healthcare institution licensed and accredited by the Department of Health and PhilHealth on National Highway, Poblacion 8, Midsayap, Cotabato.

History
The hospital was established on March 8, 2000, at a leased and refurbished hospital building located at Quezon Avenue, Poblacion 8, Midsayap, Cotabato, with an initially allowed bed-capacity of ten in-patient accommodations.

A group of five persons — a surgeon, a cardiologist, an OB-gynecologist, a general practitioner, and a registered Medtech — established MDCHI to cater to the growing health needs of the people of Midsayap and its surrounding communities.

The construction of the new hospital edifice began in 2015, according to an asset agreement between The Board and One Network Bank.  On February 7, 2017, MDCHI officially transferred operations to the new hospital building at National Highway, Poblacion 8, Midsayap, Cotabato.

Medical/clinical services
 Emergency Medicine
 Internal Medicine
 General Surgery
 Orthopedics
 Urology
 Pediatrics
 Obstetrics and Gynecology
 Anesthesiology
 Ophthalmology
 Dentistry
 ENT
 Radiology
 Pathology
 Family Medicine
 General Practice

See also
 List of hospitals in Philippines

References

Hospitals in the Philippines
Buildings and structures in Cotabato